Eren Özen (born 7 August 1983) is a Turkish football coach and former player.

References

External links

1983 births
Living people
Turkish footballers
Sportspeople from Bursa
Association football midfielders
Gaziantep F.K. footballers
Malatyaspor footballers
Gençlerbirliği S.K. footballers
Hacettepe S.K. footballers
Balıkesirspor footballers
Süper Lig players
TFF First League players
TFF Second League players
TFF Third League players